Woody Woodpecker is an animated cartoon character.

Woody Woodpecker may also refer to:

Woody Woodpecker (1941 film)
Woody Woodpecker (2017 film)
Woody Woodpecker (2018 web series)

See also

 
 
 Woodpecker (disambiguation)
 Woody (disambiguation)